Bekas may refer to:

Kasper Bekas, glider
Lilienthal Bekas, ultralight aircraft
Muhammad Mohsin Bekas, Sindhi Sufi poet
Sherko Bekas, Kurdish poet
SZD-35 Bekas, glider
Beriev Be-103 Bekas, amphibious aircraft
Bekas (film), a 2012 Kurdish film